Yasa, Yassa, or variants thereof, may refer to:

Yasa, a Buddhist bhikkhu
Yasa language, a Bantu language
Cyclone Yasa (2020), tropical weather system
YASA Motors, a British manufacturer of electric motors and generators
Yassa, a legal code created by Genghis Khan
Yassa (food), a spicy dish popular in Western Africa

People with the surname
Rabah Yassa, Algerian footballer
Ramzi Yassa (born 1948), Egyptian pianist

See also
Yasak, a fur tax used in Imperial Russia
Yasa'ur, the great-great-grandson of Chagatai Khan